Gastritis is inflammation of the lining of the stomach. It may occur as a short episode or may be of a long duration. There may be no symptoms but, when symptoms are present, the most common is upper abdominal pain (see dyspepsia). Other possible symptoms include nausea and vomiting, bloating, loss of appetite and heartburn. Complications may include stomach bleeding, stomach ulcers, and stomach tumors. When due to autoimmune problems, low red blood cells due to not enough vitamin B12 may occur, a condition known as pernicious anemia.

Common causes include infection with Helicobacter pylori and use of nonsteroidal anti-inflammatory drugs (NSAIDs). Less common causes include alcohol, smoking, cocaine, severe illness, autoimmune problems, radiation therapy and Crohn's disease. Endoscopy, a type of X-ray known as an upper gastrointestinal series, blood tests, and stool tests may help with diagnosis. The symptoms of gastritis may be a presentation of a myocardial infarction. Other conditions with similar symptoms include inflammation of the pancreas, gallbladder problems, and peptic ulcer disease.

Prevention is by avoiding things that cause the disease. Treatment includes medications such as antacids, H2 blockers, or proton pump inhibitors. During an acute attack drinking viscous lidocaine may help. If gastritis is due to NSAIDs these may be stopped. If H. pylori is present it may be treated with a combination of antibiotics such as amoxicillin and clarithromycin. For those with pernicious anemia, vitamin B12 supplements are recommended either by mouth or by injection. People are usually advised to avoid foods that bother them.

Gastritis is believed to affect about half of people worldwide. In 2013 there were approximately 90 million new cases of the condition. As people get older the disease becomes more common. It, along with a similar condition in the first part of the intestines known as duodenitis, resulted in 50,000 deaths in 2015. H. pylori was first discovered in 1981 by Barry Marshall and Robin Warren.

Signs and symptoms 

Many people with gastritis experience no symptoms at all. However, upper central abdominal pain is the most common symptom; the pain may be dull, vague, burning, aching, gnawing, sore, or sharp. Pain is usually located in the upper central portion of the abdomen, but it may occur anywhere from the upper left portion of the abdomen around to the back.

Other signs and symptoms may include the following:
 Nausea
 Vomiting (may be clear, green or yellow, blood-streaked or completely bloody depending on the severity of the stomach inflammation)
 Belching (does not usually relieve stomach pain if present)
 Bloating
 Early satiety
 Loss of appetite
 Unexplained weight loss

Causes 
There are two categories of gastritis depending on the cause of the disease. There is erosive gastritis, for which the common causes are stress, alcohol, some drugs, such as aspirin and other nonsteroidal anti-inflammatory drugs (NSAIDs), and Crohn's disease.  And, there is non-erosive gastritis, for which the most common cause is a Helicobacter pylori infection.

Helicobacter pylori
Helicobacter pylori colonizes the stomachs of more than half of the world's population, and the infection continues to play a key role in the pathogenesis of a number of gastroduodenal diseases. Colonization of the gastric mucosa with Helicobacter pylori results in the development of chronic gastritis in infected individuals and, in a subset of patients, chronic gastritis progresses to complications (e.g., ulcer disease, stomach cancers, and some distinct extragastric disorders). However, more than 80% of individuals infected with the bacterium are asymptomatic and it has been postulated that it may play an important role in the natural stomach ecology.

Critical illness
Gastritis may also develop after major surgery or traumatic injury ("Cushing ulcer"), burns ("Curling ulcer"), or severe infections. Gastritis may also occur in those who have had weight loss surgery resulting in the banding or reconstruction of the digestive tract.

Diet
Evidence does not support a role for specific foods, including spicy foods and coffee, in the development of peptic ulcers. People are usually advised to avoid foods that bother them. There is little specific advice on diet published by authoritative sources. The website of the National Health Service of the United Kingdom advises "avoiding foods that can irritate the stomach, such as spicy, acidic or fried foods", and suggests that "you may want to talk to a GP about this".

Pathophysiology

Acute

Acute erosive gastritis typically involves discrete foci of surface necrosis due to damage to mucosal defenses. NSAIDs inhibit cyclooxygenase-1, or COX-1, an enzyme responsible for the biosynthesis of eicosanoids in the stomach, which increases the possibility of peptic ulcers forming.  Also, NSAIDs, such as aspirin, reduce a substance that protects the stomach called prostaglandin. These drugs used in a short period are not typically dangerous. However, regular use can lead to gastritis. Additionally, severe physiologic stress ("stress ulcers") from sepsis, hypoxia, trauma, or surgery is also a common etiology for acute erosive gastritis. This form of gastritis can occur in more than 5% of hospitalized patients.

Also, note that alcohol consumption does not cause chronic gastritis.  It does, however, erode the mucosal lining of the stomach; low doses of alcohol stimulate hydrochloric acid secretion. High doses of alcohol do not stimulate secretion of acid.

Chronic
Chronic gastritis refers to a wide range of problems of the gastric tissues.  The immune system makes proteins and antibodies that fight infections in the body to maintain a homeostatic condition.  In some disorders the body targets the stomach as if it were a foreign protein or pathogen; it makes antibodies against, severely damages, and may even destroy the stomach or its lining.  In some cases bile, normally used to aid digestion in the small intestine, will enter through the pyloric valve of the stomach if it has been removed during surgery or does not work properly, also leading to gastritis.  Gastritis may also be caused by other medical conditions, including HIV/AIDS, Crohn's disease, certain connective tissue disorders, and liver or kidney failure. Since 1992, chronic gastritis lesions are classified according to the Sydney system.

Metaplasia
Mucous gland metaplasia, the reversible replacement of differentiated cells, occurs in the setting of severe damage of the gastric glands, which then waste away (atrophic gastritis) and are progressively replaced by mucous glands. Gastric ulcers may develop; it is unclear if they are the causes or the consequences.  Intestinal metaplasia typically begins in response to chronic mucosal injury in the antrum and may extend to the body. Gastric mucosa cells change to resemble intestinal mucosa and may even assume absorptive characteristics. Intestinal metaplasia is classified histologically as complete or incomplete. With complete metaplasia, gastric mucosa is completely transformed into small-bowel mucosa, both histologically and functionally, with the ability to absorb nutrients and secrete peptides. In incomplete metaplasia, the epithelium assumes a histologic appearance closer to that of the large intestine and frequently exhibits dysplasia.

Diagnosis 

Often, a diagnosis can be made based on  patients' description of their symptoms. Other methods which may be used to verify gastritis include:
 Blood tests:
 Blood cell count
 Presence of H. pylori
 Liver, kidney, gallbladder, or pancreas functions
 Urinalysis
 Stool sample, to look for blood in the stool
 X-rays
 Endoscopy, to check for stomach lining inflammation and mucous erosion
 Stomach biopsy, to test for gastritis and other conditions

The OLGA staging frame of chronic gastritis on histopathology. Atrophy is scored as the percentage of atrophic glands and scored on a four-tiered scale. No atrophy (0%) = score 0; mild atrophy (1–30%) = score 1; moderate atrophy (31–60%) = score 2; 9 severe atrophy (>60%) = score 3. These scores (0–3) are used in the OLGA staging assessment in each 10 compartment:

Treatment
Antacids are a common treatment for mild to medium gastritis. When antacids do not provide enough relief, medications such as H2 blockers and proton-pump inhibitors that help reduce the amount of acid are often prescribed.

Cytoprotective agents are designed to help protect the tissues that line the stomach and small intestine. They include the medications sucralfate and misoprostol. If NSAIDs are being taken regularly, one of these medications to protect the stomach may also be taken. Another cytoprotective agent is bismuth subsalicylate

Several regimens are used to treat H. pylori infection. Most use a combination of two antibiotics and a proton pump inhibitor. Sometimes bismuth is added to the regimen.

History
In 1,000 A.D, Avicenna first gave the description of stomach cancer. In 1728, German physician Georg Ernst Stahl first coined the term "gastritis". Italian anatomical pathologist Giovanni Battista Morgagni further described the characteristics of gastric inflammation. He described the characteristics of erosive or ulcerative gastritis and erosive gastritis. Between 1808 and 1831, French physician François-Joseph-Victor Broussais gathered information from the autopsies of dead French soldiers. He described chronic gastritis as "Gastritide" and erroneously believed that gastritis was the cause of ascites, typhoid fever, and meningitis. In 1854, Charles Handfield Jones and Wilson Fox described the microscopic changes of stomach inner lining in gastritis which existed in diffuse and segmental forms. In 1855, Baron Carl von Rokitansky first described hypertrophic gastritis. In 1859, British physician, William Brinton first described about acute, subacute, and chronic gastritis. In 1870, Samuel Fenwick noted that pernicious anemia causes glandular atrophy in gastritis. German surgeon Georg Ernst Konjetzny noticed that both gastric ulcer and gastric cancer are the results of gastric inflammation. Shields Warren and Willam A. Meissner described the intestinal metaplasia of the stomach as a feature of chronic gastritis.

See also 
 Gastroenteritis
 Esophagitis

References

Further reading

External links

Inflammations
Conditions diagnosed by stool test
Stomach disorders
Wikipedia medicine articles ready to translate
Wikipedia emergency medicine articles ready to translate